The Skopje Police Raid was a military operation conducted by the Macedonian police during the 2001 insurgency in Macedonia against ethnic Albanian rebels in a suburb in Skopje, the police successfully neutralized the armed group and captured their weapons supplies. Ethnic Albanian politicians acknowledged the police raid and the deaths but refused to comment. Members of the NLA, and ethnic Albanians claimed the men were civilians.

Background

The police raid was part of an ongoing military conflict between the Macedonian security forces and ethnic Albanian guerrillas known as the NLA, the rebels claimed they were fighting for increased civil rights for the country's ethnic Albanian minority while the Macedonian government accused the rebels of trying to split the country on ethnic grounds and detach parts of its territory.

Raid

The raid took place on August 7, 2001, in the Skopje suburb of Čair at 5:00 AM, the Macedonian police acted on information from an unknown source which claimed that NLA rebels were planning an attack on the capital, and that the rebels were from the nearby town of Aračinovo, the site of the Aračinovo crisis a month prior, after which they were evacuated by NATO forces, during the fighting in Aračinovo the rebels claimed they would attack the capital city of Skopje, including the airport and oil refinery and that they had infiltrated cells ready to attack. According to Macedonian interior minister Ljube Boskovski the police tried to arrest the rebels who opened fire on the police, he said they offered strong resistance and the police was forced to return fire. The Macedonian police found a large quantity of weapons, including 6 assault rifles, 5 grenade launchers, 400 rounds of ammunition, 5 pistols, 3 grenades and combat uniforms. Members of Macedonia's ethnic Albanian community confirmed the deaths in the police raid but refused to comment.

Aftermath

The following day the NLA attacked a Macedonian army convoy near Tetovo in what would become the Karpalak Ambush, supposedly as retaliation for the 5 Albanians killed by the police in the raid, the NLA claimed the men were civilians.

See also

 Karpalak Ambush
 Aračinovo crisis

References

2001 insurgency in Macedonia
August 2001 events in Europe
History of Skopje